Is This Anything? is a 2020 book written by Jerry Seinfeld.

The book is a collection of Seinfeld's comedic writings over the span of his 45-year career and compiles some of his best jokes. The title is based on the main question a comedian asks when they are testing out new material. The book scored a spot on the New York Times Best Seller list.

Contents 

The book is split up by decade from the 1970s to the 2010s.

References

2020 non-fiction books
American autobiographies
Audiobooks
Autobiographies
Comedy books
Simon & Schuster books